Aaron Tony Slight  (born 19 January 1966) is a New Zealand former professional motorcycle road racer. He later competed in car racing and now is a television presenter for AA Torque, a motoring show on New Zealand television.

Motorcycle racing career
Born in Masterton, New Zealand, Slight was Australian Superbike Champion in 1991, before spending most of the 1990s racing in the Superbike World Championship, amassing 87 podiums, 13 wins and 8 pole. For many years he was the only rider to win the Suzuka 8 Hours race for three consecutive years, having done so in 1993–1995. This feat has been repeated only recently by multiple Japanese Superbike Champion Katsuyuki Nakasuga in 2015–2018. Although Nakasuga was only declared a winner in 2018 due to being part of the three rider team (with Sam Lowes and Michael Van Der Mark) even though he did not ride in the race due to an injury. Officially Nakasuga is a four-time-in-a-row winner but in reality he has only matched Slight's three time record respectively.

He won his first WSB race during the 1992 season on a Kawasaki for Team Moving Kawasaki. On a factory Castrol Honda he was third overall in 1994 and 1995, taking his first Honda win at Albacete. The only real low note was Laguna Seca in 1995, where a poorly handling Honda and many local wildcards left him 18th on the grid. He was runner-up to Troy Corser in 1996, and third again in 1997 as teammate John Kocinski won the title.

In 1998 he was second to Carl Fogarty by 5.5 points (half points having been awarded in the shortened Laguna Seca race 1), only missing the title due to mishaps such as a last-lap engine failure at Monza, a last-lap incident with back-marker Jean-Marc Deletang at Philip Island, and missing race 2 at Laguna Seca due to a startline pileup on the aborted attempt to restart the first race. He did however take his first career double victory, at Misano.

He did not win a race in 1999; he crossed the line first in race 1 at Hockenheimring after passing Carl Fogarty on the last lap, but a red flag has been shown due to an incident elsewhere on the track, so the results were taken a lap back. Ironically, as Fogarty had already clinched the title, he did not need to win the race. He missed the start of the season in 2000 and then made his final appearance in the Opening Round of the 2001 American Superbike Championship at Daytona Speedway.

Car racing career
He raced in the British Touring Car Championship, ASCAR Racing Series and the British GT Championship.

Personal life
In the 2000 Queen's Birthday Honours, Slight was appointed a Member of the New Zealand Order of Merit, for services to motor sport.

Racing record

Superbike World Championship

Races by year
(key) (Races in bold indicate pole position) (Races in italics indicate fastest lap)

Complete British Touring Car Championship results
(key) Races in bold indicate pole position (1 point awarded all races) Races in italics indicate fastest lap (1 point awarded all races) * signifies that driver lead feature race for at least one lap (1 point awarded)

† Not eligible for points

Complete Porsche Supercup results
(key) (Races in bold indicate pole position) (Races in italics indicate fastest lap)

‡ – Guest driver – Not eligible for points.

References

External links

 Official site
 Article on his brain condition

1966 births
Living people
New Zealand motorcycle racers
Superbike World Championship riders
New Zealand racing drivers
British Touring Car Championship drivers
New Zealand television presenters
Sportspeople from Masterton
ASCAR drivers
Porsche Carrera Cup GB drivers
Members of the New Zealand Order of Merit
British GT Championship drivers
Peugeot Sport drivers